is a Japanese one-shot manga series written and illustrated by Akira Toriyama. Spanning eight total installments published irregularly between 1999 and 2005 in Weekly Shōnen Jump and Monthly Shōnen Jump, they were collected into a single kanzenban volume in April 2005 by Shueisha. Its later portion is named  and is a self-parody of Toriyama's Dragon Ball.

Plot
The series revolves around the adventures of the Neko Majin, a race of cat-creatures who enjoy practical jokes and martial arts. At least two use Dragon Ball-style attacks such as the "Nekohameha", while one in particular, named "Z", wears an outfit like Dragon Balls Son Goku, and carries a nyoi-bo. As the series transitions to Neko Majin Z, it becomes increasingly intertwined with the Dragon Ball world as regular characters join the cast, including an overweight Saiyan named Onio, and Frieza's son Kuriza. There are also guest appearances by Vegeta, Majin Buu, Son Goku and his family members.

Characters
 
A race of magical cat-creatures, who span a variety of breeds and body-shapes, although most appear to have distinctive long ears in the manner of the author's Cornish Rex. Mix and Z are both blue, while Mike sports calico fur; all three are of a similar, round body shape, and are drawn with angled slits for eyes. These Neko Majin possess abilities similar to Dragon Ball characters, such as flight and the "Nekohameha",, similar to the Kamehameha. They are also capable of using some magic, such as the transformation abilities demonstrated by Neko Majin Mike. The source of these abilities appears to be a ball called a Majin Orb (majin-dama), without which they lose all powers. A common trait seems to be conning visitors with various services. Z in particular dresses as a koala and charges eight dollars to take pictures with them. He has a Super Saiyan-like transformation called Super Neko Majin.

A boy that Neko Majin Mike met about 30 years ago. He has since grown up to become a teacher at a small local school.

A Saiyan with the overall body-shape and facial structure as Suppaman, Parzan, and Bubibinman from Toriyama's manga Dr. Slump. He first appears on Earth on honeymoon and desires to conquer the Earth and wipe out its inhabitants in order to make it a vacation home. He and his wife take a photo with the "koala" Z, but when the Neko Majin fondles his wife's breasts, he becomes enraged and transforms into a Super Saiyan. However, he is quickly defeated.  He returns with Kuriza for further encounters with Z.

A nationally renowned fighter who is challenged by Neko Majin Z. He, too, has a girlfriend that he calls "Honey". In his fight with Z, he realizes that he is no match, and tries to get out of the battle except that Honey eggs Z on.

The son of Dragon Ball villain, Freeza; he resembles his father except that his head is in the shape of a chestnut. He is called by Onio to destroy Z, but runs out of pages for the fight. He later plays soccer with the gang. He frequently mentions that Neko Majin is wasting pages with meaningless comments and battle scenes.
 Vegeta
Vegeta is called to Earth by Kuriza and Onio, who need help to defeat Z. Vegeta discovers that the Neko Majin is surprisingly strong, but receives an "urgent call" that requires him to return to his home planet. He vows that he will never appear in another gag manga.
 Majin Buu
 Majin Boo makes a short appearance to help when Neko Majin Z is rendered helpless by Usa Majin (the lesser-known rabbit version of Neko Majin). Every time Z was not in the scene, Buu would appear, making people think he was the Neko Majin.
 Goku
 Goku makes an appearance in the last chapter of Neko Majin Z where he spars with Z. He then tells the Neko Majin there is a new evil that he needs help to defeat at his family home. When they get there, Z learns that it is just a mouse in the pantry.

Production
Akira Toriyama originally drew Neko Majin as a single one-shot, enjoying the relaxed and silly feel it has. He suggested that the reason it became a Dragon Ball parody was probably because he ran out of material and moved away from its original premise.

Manga
Neko Majin is a series of one-shots written and illustrated by Akira Toriyama that were published irregularly in both Weekly Shōnen Jump and Monthly Shōnen Jump. The first, "Neko Majin is Here", was published in Weekly Shōnen Jump 1999 #22-23, the second in 1999 #37-38. Although there were some similarities, it did not become a self-parody of Dragon Ball until Neko Majin Z in Monthly Shōnen Jump 2001 #6, published in May 2001. After the second Neko Majin Z in Monthly Shōnen Jump 2003 #9. "Neko Majin Mike" was published in Weekly Shōnen Jump 2003 #37-38, concurrently with "Neko Majin Z 2". "Neko Majin Z" was published in Monthly Shōnen Jump 2004 #3, while the final two "Z" chapters were published back-to-back in Monthly Shōnen Jump 2005 #1 and #2. All eight chapters were compiled into a single kanzenban volume on April 4, 2005 by Shueisha. On April 4, 2013, the chapters were fully colored and the kanzenban was released digitally.

In the October 2007 issue of the North American version of Shonen Jump, Viz Media included a translation of Neko Majin Z 5; however, no other chapters and no collected release have been made legally available in English. The kanzenban was published in France by Glénat in 2006. In February 2007, Italian publisher Star Comics also released the kanzenban, using a green background cover instead of the original yellow.

Chapter list

Other media
Neko Majin characters have appeared in Dragon Ball related video games. In the Japanese version of the video game Dragon Ball Z: Budokai 2, Freeza has an alternate outfit where he assumes the form of Kuriza and has a chestnut-shaped Death Ball attack. Neko Majin Z appears as a secret support character in the Japanese version of Dragon Ball Z: Supersonic Warriors 2.
In Dragon Ball Super, the character Majin Buu can be seen reading a book containing a Japanese fairy tale named "Urashima Taro" with Neko Majin in the front cover.

References 

 Manga references
  Neko Majin ga Iru: April 1999 (Weekly Shōnen Jump, 1999 #22-23)
  Neko Majin ga Iru 2: August 1999 (Weekly Shōnen Jump, 1999 #37-38)
  Neko Majin Z: June 2001 (Monthly Shōnen Jump, 2001 #6)
  Neko Majin Z 2: August 2003 (Monthly Shōnen Jump, 2003 #9)
  Neko Majin Mike: August 2003 (Weekly Shōnen Jump, 2003 #37-38)
  Neko Majin Z 3: February 2004 (Monthly Shōnen Jump, 2004 #3)
  Neko Majin Z 4: January 2005 (Monthly Shōnen Jump, 2005 #1)
  Neko Majin Z 5: February 2005 (Monthly Shōnen Jump, 2005 #2)

 Other references

1999 manga
Akira Toriyama
Crossover anime and manga
Dragon Ball mass media
Fictional cats
Fictional genies
Viz Media manga
Shōnen manga
Shueisha manga